Kālikā Mata Temple (or Kalikamata) is a Hindu goddess temple complex and pilgrim centre at the summit of Pavagadh Hill in Panchmahal District, India, with in the Champaner-Pavagadh Archaeological Park. It dates from the 10th or 11th centuries. The temple has three images of goddesses: the central image is of Kalika Mata, flanked by Kali on the right and Bahucharamata on the left. On Chitra sud 8, a fair is held at the temple which is attended by thousands of devotees. The temple is the site of one of the Great holy Shakti Peethas. One can easily reach the temple by ropeway.

Geography
The temple complex is part of the Champaner-Pavagadh Archaeological Park, a UNESCO World Heritage Site. It is set amidst a dense forest cover on a cliff.

The path passes the ruins of Patai Raval's palace ruins. Alternatively, there is a Pavagadh ropeway access, which was commissioned in 1986.

History 

Dating from the 10th-11th centuries, Kalika Mata is the oldest temple in the area.According to R. K. Trivedi in Fairs and Festivals of Gujarat (1961), the goddess Kalika Mata was initially worshipped by the local Bhil  and Koli People, until she was later invoked and installed by Vishvamitra on Pavagadh Hill summit, where she is worshipped as a form of Durga or Chandi.There is a legend associated with this temple, Once during the festival of Navratri, the temple had organised a traditional dance called Garba, where hundreds of devotees got together and danced out of devotion towards the Goddess. Seeing such unconditional devotion, Goddess Mahakali herself came amidst the devotees disguised as a local woman and danced with them. Meanwhile, the king of that kingdom Patai Jaisinh who was also dancing with the devotees happened to see the woman and was enchanted with her beauty. Filled with lust, the King held her hand and made an inappropriate proposal. The Goddess warned him thrice to leave her hand and apologize, but the king was too overwhelmed with lust to understand anything. Thus the Goddess cursed that his empire would fall. Soon a Muslim invader Mahmud Begada invaded the kingdom. Patai Jaisinh lost the battle and was killed by Mahmud Begada. Pavagadh's Kalika Mata is also worshipped by the Adivasi. The temple was described in Gangadas Pratap Vilasa Natakam, a 15th-century drama. Named in honor of the Goddess Kali, the temple is believed to be the Kali Mata's residence, and is one of the Shakti Peethas, as the symbolic toe of the goddess Sati is said to have fallen here.

Architecture and fittings
The small and plain temple is set amidst fortifications with an open yard in the front, and is open for long hours to cater to the rush of pilgrims. There  are two altars in front of the temple for offering sacrifices to the Goddess, but any kind of animal sacrifice is strictly banned since almost two to three centuries now. The Kali yantra is worshipped at the temple.

The complex is divided into two parts, the ground floor containing Hindu shrines, while the temple spire is domed with a Muslim shrine. The chief shrine on the ground floor contains three divine images: in the centre Kalika Mata in the centre (depicted in the form of a head, known as mukhwato and red in colour), while Mahakali is situated to her right and Bahuchara Mata to her left. The restored marble floor dates to about 1859 and was presented by the minister of Limbdi in Kathiawar. The domed temple spire contains a Muslim shrine and mausoleum to Sadan Shah Pir, a Sufi saint.

Following redevelopment of the temple in 2022, the dargah was shifted nearby and the new shikhara of the temple was built.

Festivals
 
The temple is one of the biggest tourist and pilgrimage centers in Gujarat, attracting large numbers of people every year. It is a Chodhri tradition to make a pilgrimage here at least once in a lifetime. Devotees of Kalika Mata visiting the temple "worshipped by beating bell-metal symbols". A fair is held each year at the temple on Chaitra Sud 8. Especially on the full moon of Chaitra, in April, and at Dasara, in October, there are large meetings of Hindus of all classes. . Every year in September and October during Navratri (9 day devotion of all shakti goddess) large number of devotees come together for celebration.

See also
 Jain temples, Pavagadh
 Monuments of Champaner-Pavagadh Archaeological Park

References

External links
Video
Video

10th-century Hindu temples
Hindu temples in Gujarat
Kali temples
Shakti Peethas
Champaner-Pavagadh Archaeological Park
10th-century establishments in India